Alexander Ellice (17911853) was a British naval officer, and for four years Member of Parliament for the constituency of Harwich, Essex. He was thereafter Comptroller of the Steam Department at the Admiralty for a year.

Biography

Alexander Ellice was born 3 October 1791 in London, the son of the merchant and fur trader Alexander Ellice, and Ann Ellice (née Russell). In 1795, his father purchased the Seigneury of Villechauve from Michel Chartier de Lotbinière, Marquis de Lotbinière. His brothers include General Robert Ellice, and the politician and Hudson's Bay merchant Edward Ellice.

Alexander Ellice entered the Navy, 2 August 1806, as a volunteer, on board , under Captain George Edmund Byron Bettesworth; and afterwards joining  as midshipman, was present on 15 May 1808 in a severe action of an hour and a half with a Danish flotilla, near Bergen, in which Captain Butterworth was killed.
 
During that period, among other services, he took part on 17 August 1812 in - according to the Naval Biographical Dictionary - a spirited skirmish with a powerful Neapolitan squadron in the Gulf of Naples.

He was promoted to the rank of lieutenant on 30 October 1813, and transferred to  under Captain William Hall Gage. Ellice subsequently joined – on 18 January 1814, bearing the flag of Lord Exmouth, under whom he appears to have been soon afterwards present in a partial action with the Toulon fleet – on 2 June 1814,  and on 29 April 1815, commanded on the North American station by Captains Lord Prudhoe, Robert Rodney, and Hyde Parker – on 6 March 1816, under Captain William Paterson, in which ship, after participating in the 1816 Bombardment of Algiers, he served for four years in the East Indies under the flag of Sir Richard King – and, on 27 May 1822, as first-lieutenant, under Captain George Augustus Westphal, employed on Particular Service.

He attained the rank of commander on 19 February 1823; and was married, 28 September 1826 to Lucy Frances, daughter of Charles Lock, the British consul-general in Naples during the Neapolitan Revolution of 1799.

In the 1837 United Kingdom general election, Ellice was on the 24 July 1837 elected MP for Harwich, in the Whig interest, serving until the dissolution of the 13th UK Parliament on 23 June 1841. He did not stand in subsequent elections.

He went on half-pay from 1846, and was appointed, on 2 December 1846, to succeed Sir William Edward Parry in the Comptrollership of Steam Machinery; Ellice was replaced after a year by Thomas Lloyd.

Alexander Ellice died on 8 October 1853. There is a monument for him in St Mary's Parish Church, Hampton.

The Centre for the Study of the Legacies of British Slave-ownership notes that Alexander Ellice renounced a claim arising from slaves held on the Morant estate in St Thomas-in-the-East, Jamaica, in favour of one A R Blake; but holds no further enlightening details.

References

Attribution
This article contains text now in the public domain from

External links
 

1791 births
1853 deaths
Royal Navy officers
UK MPs 1837–1841
Ellice family
Royal Navy personnel of the Bombardment of Algiers (1816)
Whig (British political party) MPs for English constituencies